The Fromberg Concrete Arch Bridge, in Fromberg, Montana, was built in 1914. It was listed on the National Register of Historic Places in 1993. It carries River Street over the Clarks Fork Yellowstone River.

It is a three-span concrete deck arch bridge designed by Carbon County, Montana, surveyor C. A. Gibson and was "quite advanced for the time": it has "flattened parabolic arches with a rise to span ratio of 1 to 7." At its completion it was the largest concrete bridge in the state.

In 1993 it was the oldest multi-arch concrete bridge surviving in the state.

See also
List of bridges documented by the Historic American Engineering Record in Montana

References

External links

Bridges on the National Register of Historic Places in Montana
Concrete bridges in the United States
Historic American Engineering Record in Montana
National Register of Historic Places in Carbon County, Montana
Bridges completed in 1914
1914 establishments in Montana
Arch bridges in the United States